The Damned Thing may refer to:

 "The Damned Thing" (short story), a classic 1893 short story by Ambrose Bierce
 The Damned Thing (Masters of Horror), an episode of the film anthology series Masters of Horror